David Patrick Martin Ekserdjian (born 28 October 1955) is professor of art and film history at the University of Leicester.

Selected publications
Correggio. 1997.
Parmigianino. 2006.
Treasures from Budapest. European Masterpieces from Leonardo to Schiele. 2010. (editor)
Bronze. Royal Academy of Arts, London, 2012. (With Cecilia Treves) 
Correggio and Parmigianino: Art in Parma During the Sixteenth Century. 2016.

References

External links 
https://www.apollo-magazine.com/author/david-ekserdjian/

1955 births
British art historians
Living people